Raikov is a Russian surname.
Dmitry Raikov, mathematician
Yevgeny Tikhonovich Raikov, opera singer
Boris Yevgenyevich Raikov, biologist

See also
 Raikov (Metal Gear)